Naruto is a Japanese manga series written and illustrated by Masashi Kishimoto and published by Shueisha in Weekly Shōnen Jump. It tells the story of Naruto Uzumaki, an adolescent ninja who searches constantly for recognition and dreams of becoming the Hokage, the ninja in his village who is acknowledged as the leader and the strongest of all. The manga made its debut on September 21, 1999, and it concluded on November 10, 2014. A total of 72 volumes and 700 chapters were released. The books published in Japan by Shueisha under various imprints were adapted or expanded upon the Naruto manga and anime series. Several of the titles have been licensed for publication in North America by Viz Media. The first part of the anime was released on October 10, 2002, and it concluded on February 8, 2007, with a total of 220 episodes. The second part of the anime was released on February 15, 2007, and it concluded on March 23, 2017, with a total of 500 episodes. Aside from that, there has been other material released based on the series, such as anime comics, light novels, artbooks, supplemental guidebooks, original video animation (OVAs), and movies.

Original series

Manga

Anime

Spin-off series

Manga

Super deformed spin-offs

Anime

Anime comics
Various anime comics have been released in Japan under Shueisha's Jump Comics inprint, typically adapting the Naruto and Naruto Shippuden theatrical films, though adaptations of the first Naruto OVA and a sixth season Naruto Shippuden TV special were also produced. Viz Media licensed and published the anime comic adaptations of the three Naruto films in North America in October 2007 and November 2008.

Naruto

Naruto Shippuden

Collections

Fiction books

Novelizations

From 2002 through 2009, Shueisha published light novel adaptations of the first seven Naruto and Naruto Shippuden films, as well as adaptations of the "Land of Waves" Naruto story arc and the first Naruto OVA, all written by Masatoshi Kusakabe. Adaptations of Blood Prison and Road to Ninja were published in 2011 and 2012, written by Akira Higashiyama and Yuka Miyata, respectively. The first two of Masatoshi Kusakabe's novelizations were licensed by Viz Media for publication in North America in November 2006 and October 2007.

Original novels

Three original stories written by Akira Higashiyama and illustrated by Masashi Kishimoto have been published in Japan.

Naruto Secret Chronicles series

 is a light novel series illustrated by Masashi Kishimoto, which explores the stories of various characters after the conclusion of the original Naruto manga series. Announced in November 2014 alongside the final chapter of the manga, the series comprises six volumes, with the first released in February 2015. Viz Media began publishing English translations of the novels in November 2015, starting with Naruto: Kakashi's Story.

Naruto True Stories series

 is a light novel trilogy illustrated by Masashi Kishimoto, which explores Itachi Uchiha's past and Sasuke Uchiha's future. The Naruto True Story novels were announced in June 2015, with a publication date in Fall 2015. Viz Media began publishing English translations of the novels in November 2016.

Naruto Retsuden Stories Series

Naruto Retsuden (NARUTO -ナルト- 烈伝, literally meaning: Naruto Intense Story) is a light novel series which was released from June to October 2019.

Supplemental material
Several supplemental guides and artbooks have been published, collecting information and artwork from the manga and anime series. Three of the artbooks collect Masashi Kishimoto's illustrations for the manga and related promotional materials, while a fourth anniversary book features artwork produced over the first ten years of the anime series' broadcast. Among the guidebooks, there are three anime profile books, which contain character profiles and images taken from the anime; two fanbooks, which include interviews, articles, and special features relating to the manga; and three data books, which collect detailed information on the characters, abilities, locations, and story arcs seen in the manga. A guidebook for the theatrical film Road to Ninja: Naruto the Movie was also published and distributed with copies of Naruto volume 61; featuring information on the film, an interview with Kishimoto, and the Movie 9: Road to Naruto the Movie one-shot, it was printed in the same format as a standard Naruto volume.

Anime profiles

Artbooks

Data books

Other guides

Films

Theatrical films 
 Ninja Clash in the Land of Snow (2004). Team 7 travels to the Land of Snow to protect the actors during the shooting of the new Princess Fuun movie. The fourth original video animation, Konoha Annual Sports Festival, was included with the Japanese release of the film.
 Legend of the Stone of Gelel (2005). Naruto, Shikamaru, and Sakura go on a ninja mission involving them in a war between the Sunaga village and a large force of armored warriors. Unlike its predecessor, Legend of the Stone of Gelel did not have a theatrical release in the United States but was released in direct-to-video format instead.
 Guardians of the Crescent Moon Kingdom (2006). Naruto, Sakura, Lee, and Kakashi are assigned to protect the future prince of the Land of Moon, Hikaru Tsuki.
 Naruto Shippuden the Movie (2007). Naruto goes on a mission to protect the priestess Shion, who starts to have visions of his death.
 Naruto Shippuden the Movie: Bonds (2008). Naruto and Sasuke join forces when ninja from the Sky Country attack Konoha.
 Naruto Shippuden the Movie: The Will of Fire (2009).  Team 7 works to prevent Kakashi from sacrificing himself to end a world war.
 Naruto Shippuden the Movie: The Lost Tower (2010). Naruto is sent 20 years into the past as he explores a mystical tower to capture a rogue ninja and discovers the Fourth Hokage, his father, alive in the timeline.
 Naruto the Movie: Blood Prison (2011). Naruto is framed for attempted murder of the Raikage; as he tries to break out of the prison, he discovers its secrets.
 Road to Ninja: Naruto the Movie (2012). Naruto and Sakura are sent to an alternate universe by Tobi and discover the meaning of companionship and parenthood. The story planning and character designs were created by Masashi Kishimoto.
 The Last: Naruto the Movie (2014). Naruto and his companions try to stop the moon from colliding with Earth. The film explains some loose ends involving the series' mythology and focuses on Naruto and Hinata's romantic relationship. The story and character designs were created by Masashi Kishimoto, who also served as chief story supervisor.
 Boruto: Naruto the Movie (2015). The film focuses on the children of the main characters, mainly Boruto Uzumaki, who trains with his father's rival Sasuke to surpass him. The story, screenplay and character designs were created by Masashi Kishimoto, who also served as chief production supervisor.

Original video animations 
 Find the Crimson Four-Leaf Clover!  (2002). It centers on Naruto as he along with Team 7, helps Konohamaru with his mission to retrieve a four leaf clover that makes a wish come true.
 Mission: Protect the Waterfall Village! (2003). Naruto, Sasuke, Sakura, and Kakashi, are on a mission to escort a shinobi to his hometown. This and the previous OVA were later released on DVD in Australia under the title Naruto Jump Festa Collection. The English localization of Mission: Protect the Waterfall Village! was released on DVD by Viz on May 22, 2007, in the US under the title Naruto  The Lost Story.
 Konoha Annual Sports Festival. (2004) Multiple groups of shinobi, including Team 7, participate in a sports competition where the award is a week break from missions. A short video released with the first Naruto movie; in North America, this was included on the Deluxe Edition DVD of the first film.
 Finally a clash! Jonin VS Genin!! Indiscriminate grand melee tournament meeting!! (2005) Fifth Hokage Tsunade creates a competition between Jonin (high level ninja) and Genin (low level ninja). Released on a bonus disk with the Japanese edition of the Naruto: Ultimate Ninja 3 video game for the PlayStation 2.
 Hurricane! "Konoha Academy" Chronicles (2008). This OVA follows Naruto Uzumaki and his peers as they live their lives in high school.
 Naruto: The Cross Roads (2009). Focuses on Team 7 after their encounter with Zabuza and Haku.
 Naruto, The Genie, and The Three Wishes!! (2010). While Team 7 are at the beach, Naruto finds a bottle and opens it to find a genie who grants three wishes.
 Naruto x UT (2011). Naruto is defeated by Sasuke and is pronounced dead; the events leading to the combat are shown in flashback.
 Chūnin Exam on Fire! Naruto vs. Konohamaru! (2011). Naruto and Konohamaru are participants in the Chunin Exams, and are matched with each other; they fight with no limits.
 Hashirama Senju vs. Madara Uchiha (2012). Tobi narrates the origin of Konoha. In the beginning, ninja fought for their own clans. The most powerful among them are two clans: the Senju led by Hashirama, and the Uchiha led by Madara. This was distributed as part of the Naruto Shippuden: Ultimate Ninja Storm Generations video game for the PlayStation 3 and Xbox 360.
 Naruto Shippūden: Sunny Side Battle!!! (2014). In his sleep, Sasuke dreams of his brother Itachi making him breakfast repeatedly until it is perfect.
 The Day Naruto Became Hokage (2016). Naruto Uzumaki is officially the Seventh Hokage, but does not make it to the ceremony.

Stage Play Video Releases

Notes

References

Book series introduced in 2002
media
Anime and manga lists
Mass media by franchise
Media